Ali Sina Rabbani is an Iranian football midfielder who currently plays for Iranian football club Foolad in the Iran Pro League.

Club career

Foolad
He started his career with Foolad from youth levels. Later he joined to first team by Majid Jalali. He made debut for Foolad in third fixture of 2014–15 Iran Pro League against Rah Ahan as a substitute for Soroush Rafiei.

Club career statistics

References

External links
 Ali Sina Rabbani at IranLeague.ir

1993 births
Living people
Iranian footballers
Foolad FC players
People from Ahvaz
Association football midfielders
Sportspeople from Khuzestan province